Hawkins Field is a baseball stadium in Nashville, Tennessee. It is the home field of the Vanderbilt Commodores college baseball team.  The stadium opened in 2002 adjacent to Vanderbilt Stadium and Memorial Gymnasium and holds 3,700 people.  In 2010, the Nashville Outlaws, a collegiate summer baseball team of the Prospect League, used Hawkins Field as their home ballpark.

The venue is named for the family of Charles Hawkins III, a benefactor of the university and baseball program.

Features
The Vanderbilt athletics site describes its "brick and wrought-iron fence design."  Its left field wall is 35 feet high, a comparable height to the Green Monster at Fenway Park. Memorial Gymnasium is behind the left field fence, and Vanderbilt Stadium's east bleachers are adjacent to the third base stands.

Renovations
In 2006, a complex including a locker room, offices, and a weight room was added along the third base line.

In 2007, Hawkins Field was selected as a regional host site for the 2007 NCAA Division I baseball tournament. Vanderbilt and Hawkins Field again hosted Regionals in 2011, 2013, 2014, 2015, 2016, 2018 and 2019, and hosted Super Regionals in 2011, 2013, 2014, 2015, 2018 and 2019. A new scoreboard was erected and new temporary bleachers were added in right field to bring the capacity to near 3,700 for the tournament (and also the 2008 season). In late 2008, further expansions increased the stadium's permanent seating capacity to 3,700.  This includes 2,200 chairback seats and 1,500 bleacher seats. The dugouts were also renovated and a new trainer's room added.
In 2012, artificial turf replaced the grass playing field.

Attendance
In 2013, the Commodores ranked 23rd among Division I baseball programs in attendance, averaging 2,695 per home game.

See also
 List of NCAA Division I baseball venues

References

External links

Vanderbilt University's Hawkins Field

Vanderbilt Commodores baseball
College baseball venues in the United States
Sports venues in Nashville, Tennessee
Baseball venues in Tennessee
Sports venues completed in 2002
2002 establishments in Tennessee